"You Make My Heart Best Faster (And That's All That Matters)" is a song by American singer-songwriter Kim Carnes and the second single from her eighth studio album, Café Racers (1983). Carnes co-wrote the track with her husband, David Ellingson, and Q-Feel bandmates Martin Page and Brian Fairweather. The track was produced by Keith Olsen.

The single peaked at no. 54 on the Billboard Hot 100 in March 1984, and no. 15 on the Billboard Dance Club Songs chart.

A music video was shot at the historic Riverside Raceway in Riverside, California. It features local driver Steve Webb driving his classic #45 royal blue Formula Ford. The video also features British actor Ian McShane.

Format and track listings
The single was released twice.

7" vinyl released in the United States.

7" vinyl released in Germany.

Charts

References

1983 singles
Kim Carnes songs
Songs written by Kim Carnes
Songs written by Martin Page
1983 songs
EMI America Records singles